Mats Wilander defeated Guillermo Vilas in the final, 1–6, 7–6(8–6), 6–0, 6–4 to win the men's singles tennis title at the 1982 French Open. He had won the boys’ title only the previous year, and was making his first main-draw French Open appearance. It was his first ATP Tour-level title.

Björn Borg was the four-time reigning champion, but chose not to participate after the Men's Tennis Council ruled he had not played enough tournaments and would have to qualify. World No. 1 John McEnroe withdrew with an ankle injury.

Seeds
The seeded players are listed below. Mats Wilander is the champion; others show the round in which they were eliminated.

  Jimmy Connors (quarterfinals)
  Ivan Lendl (fourth round)
  Guillermo Vilas (final)
  José Luis Clerc (semifinals)
  Vitas Gerulaitis (quarterfinals)
  Eliot Teltscher (fourth round)
  Peter McNamara (quarterfinals)
  Yannick Noah (quarterfinals)
  Andrés Gómez (fourth round)
  Balázs Taróczy (second round)
  Brian Gottfried (second round)
 n/a
  José Higueras (semifinals)
  Steve Denton (first round)
  Chip Hooper (fourth round)
  Mel Purcell (fourth round)

Draw

Final eight

Section 1

Section 2

Section 3

Section 4

Section 5

Section 6

Section 7

Section 8

References

External links
 Association of Tennis Professionals (ATP) – 1982 French Open Men's Singles draw
 1982 French Open – Men's draws and results at the International Tennis Federation

Men's Singles
French Open by year – Men's singles
1982 Grand Prix (tennis)